José Vitor Lima Cardoso (born 9 February 2001), commonly known as Zé Vitor, is a Brazilian footballer who plays as a central defender for Bahia.

Club career
He made his first team – and Série A – debut on 10 July 2021, starting in a 0–1 home loss against Atlético Mineiro.

Career statistics

References

External links
América Mineiro profile 

2001 births
Living people
Sportspeople from Pernambuco
Brazilian footballers
Association football defenders
Campeonato Brasileiro Série A players
América Futebol Clube (MG) players